The black-chested buzzard-eagle (Geranoaetus melanoleucus) is a bird of prey of the hawk and eagle family (Accipitridae). It lives in open regions of South America. This species is also known as the black buzzard-eagle, the gray buzzard-eagle or analogously with "eagle" or "eagle-buzzard" replacing "buzzard-eagle", or as the Chilean blue eagle. It is sometimes placed in the genus Buteo.

Description

This is a huge eagle-like "buzzard" ("hawk" in American terminology). It is noted for its bulky, powerful-looking build. It is rather long- and broad-winged and the slightly tapering tail is short by comparison and colored black, with grey tips in fresh plumage. When perched, the wings cover the tail almost completely, giving the bird a unique near-tailess appearance when perched. The adult has a white underside, sometimes with fine blackish stripes; its upperparts are dark grey with a blackish, brownish or bluish hue. The feathers of the neck and the lowest dark feathers of the breast are somewhat elongated. Adults have an ash-grey-and-white zone on the wings, the silvery white seen clearly from afar. The female is distinguished by a reddish-cinnamon hue to the upper- and underwing secondaries and is considerably larger than the male.

The immature plumage is reminiscent of that of the great black hawk (Buteogallus urubitinga). Its upperparts are deep brown, sometimes almost black, and it has no light wing patch. The underside is white or light buff with heavy dark streaks on the breast and dark bars on the belly and thighs. It does not acquire the full adult plumage until 4–5 years old.

It is not very vocal, calling usually in flight and when close to the nest. Some calls resemble a wild human laugh, others are a curlew-like whistle. Occasionally flying birds give a high-pitched vocalization "kukukukuku".

The black-chested buzzard-eagle is readily identified in flight by its short wedge-shaped tail scarcely protruding from its long, broad wings. It is usually easy to make out the generally white underparts with the dark chest-band and tail if the birds are adult. Yet as this bird is usually encountered in the wild when it soars, you are less likely to see its grey upperparts.

Taxonomy and systematics

Its scientific name is Latinized Ancient Greek and means "black-and-white crane-eagle" or (if called Buteo melanoleucos) "black-and-white buzzard": Geranoaetus comes from Ancient Greek géranos (γέρανoς), "crane" + aetós (ἆετός), "eagle". The "crane" reference is due to its grey upper wings and its loud cries. The alternative genus name Buteo is simply the Latin term used for these hawks in Ancient Rome, translating as "buzzard" (in the European sense). melanoleucus is from Ancient Greek mélan- (μέλαν-), "black-" + leukós (λευκός), "white". This refers to the contrasting coloration when seen from below.

When the black-chested buzzard-eagle was first described by Louis Jean Pierre Vieillot in 1819, it was placed in the genus Spizaetus, as Spizaetus melanoleucus. Nowadays, however, the monotypic genus Spizastur is merged in Spizaetus, and the black-and-white hawk-eagle, originally described as by Vieillot three years earlier as Buteo melanoleucus, is now known as Spizaetus melanoleucus. The earlier use of the specific epithet melanoleucus for the black-and-white hawk-eagle technically precludes its use for the black-chested buzzard-eagle, except when it is placed in Geranoaetus. In fact, in the mid-20th century Buteo fuscescens was the prevailing name for the black-chested buzzard-eagle for some years, but it was eventually dismissed as erroneous. This specific name was established – as Spizaetus fuscescens – by Vieillot for the immature of the black-chested buzzard-eagle at the very same time as he described the adult, because he could not believe that such differently-colored birds were conspecific.

As the two birds are not placed in the same genus today, Article 59.3 of the ICZN Code applies. According to this, a junior homonym replaced before 1961 is not rendered permanently invalid (as junior homonyms usually are) if "the substitute name is not in use" – which has been the case after Amadon's 1963 revision. Hence, in this case the scientific name Buteo melanoleucus can apply, even though the black-and-white hawk-eagle was earlier described under exactly that name, while the senior homonym melanoleucus still applies to the latter species when placed in Spizaetus according to the usual ICZN rules. Consequently, the proper name to use for each bird has through a number of coincidences become the one the other species was described under.

Systematics
There are two subspecies:
 Eastern black-chested buzzard-eagle, Geranoaetus melanoleucus melanoleucus (Vieillot, 1819) – SE South America from S and E Brazil (Alagoas, Rio de Janeiro, and São Paulo states) through Paraguay, Uruguay, and NE Argentina
Larger, Plain white below.
 Western black-chested buzzard-eagle, Geranoaetus melanoleucus australis Swann, 1922 – Andes from NW Venezuela (Mérida) through Colombia (Cordillera Central, occasionally ranging into the Cordillera Occidental), Ecuador, Peru, Bolivia, Chile, and W Argentina to Tierra del Fuego
Smaller. White with fine dark barring below.

The black-chested buzzard-eagle is allied to the Buteo hawks, and it is sometimes included with these. Other authors place it in the monotypic genus Geranoaetus. Though the former seems to be more appropriate from a phylogenetic standpoint, the latter is still used here, as much more research into phylogeny and hybridization has to take place before the correct taxonomy of the buteonines can be resolved. It stands to note that the taxonomic and systematic dispute goes back to the early-mid 20th century already. However, it seems there is no real reason to suppose that the lineage of the black-chested buzzard-eagle is North American in origin; fossils that might have been its ancestors at first sight differ in details and are more likely to belong to other buteonine lineages. Because of its buteonine lineage, this species and the closely related Harpyhaliaetus are not considered "true eagles", as are Aquila eagles and "hawk-eagles", and are thus the largest extant type of the diverse buteonine lineage.

This species could be close to the white-tailed hawk (Buteo albicaudatus), and perhaps to the grey-backed (Leucopternis occidentalis), white (L. albicollis), and mantled hawks (L. polionotus) which it resembles in habitus except for being larger. Its closest living relatives may well be the red-backed (B. polyosoma) and Puna hawks (B. poecilochrous). Particularly some populations of the former look like small black-chested buzzard eagles. The barred hawk (L. princeps) looks similar to the black-chested buzzard-eagle in general color pattern, though the tail differs much in shape, size, and the bright white central band stands out.

The relationship of the black-chested buzzard-eagle to the prehistoric genera Titanohierax from the Caribbean and the Pan-American Amplibuteo also warrant more study. The crab-hawks (Buteogallus) and the solitary "eagles" (Harpyhaliaetus) seem to be allied with the latter, to the extent that these three genera might be united in Buteogallus. That genus in the present restricted sense contains species also quite similar in habitus and size to the black-chested eagle-buzzard.

Fossil record

Some fossils have been placed in Geranoaetus, but those from North America have since been moved elsewhere:
 "Geranoaetus" ales, "G." contortus and "G." conterminus are now in Buteo.
 "Geranoaetus" fragilis (Fragile "eagle") and "G." milleri (Miller's "eagle") are now in Buteogallus. The type specimens of the latter were at first erroneously believed to be of the black-chested eagle-buzzard.
 "Geranoaetus" grinnelli (Grinnell's "eagle") is now in Spizaetus.
 "Geranoaetus" dananus, originally described as "Aquila" danana, is of rather unclear affiliations but probably belongs to the same lineage as the above.

Bones indistinguishable from those of living black-chested buzzard-eagles were found in a spring deposit at the Baños de Ciego Montero in Cienfuegos Province, Cuba. A partial left carpometacarpus – Specimen AMNH FR 6190 – as well as a fingerbone probably date from some time in the Pleistocene, during the last ice age. Its contemporary close relatives on Cuba, as far as it is known, consisted of the gigantic eagle-like buteonine hawks which were clearly distinct by size alone, while the Pleistocene record of similar-sized birds from continental North America is from the far west.

Ecology
The black-chested buzzard-eagle is found in mountainous or hilly terrain with sparse vegetation, shrubland or (in the south of its range) Nothofagus forest, where it spends a lot of time soaring in thermals and vertical drafts while looking for prey. It requires large territories with suitable habitat, the páramos at the north of its range, for example, while providing the latter, fail to provide the former, and thus it has only been recorded in the largest patches of such habitat, such as Páramo de Frontino.

It is most conspicuous in the mid-morning and afternoon when individuals will seek out places that provide the best soaring conditions, such as north and west-facing slopes and ridges. Apparently, their main interest at these times is aerial play and display; they tend to ignore places where food is more plentiful or easily hunted in favor of simply soaring alone or in pairs in strong air currents.

The food of this carnivore consists mainly of mid-sized mammals; the introduced European rabbit (Oryctolagus cuniculus) seems to have become a key prey item. The black-chested buzzard-eagle is helpful to farmers by keeping down the numbers of rabbits, which can be serious agricultural pests. Native Common degus (Octodon degus) also take a large part of its diet. Other mammals are also taken such as viscachas and Caviidae rodents. Occasionally, it will take carnivores such as Humboldt's hog-nosed skunks (Conepatus humboldtii ), lesser grisons (Galictis cuja) and even larger Andes skunks (Conepatus chinga) and gray foxes (Urocyon cinereoargenteus). Its diet is rounded off with an occasional bird. Avian prey species are usually small passerines or rails but carnivorous species like the burrowing owl (Athene cunicularia) and sizeable prey such as Penelope guans, buff-necked ibis (Theristicus caudatus) or the Chilean tinamou (Nothoprocta perdicaria) are also taken. large squamates, and if need be also arthropods and carrion will be added in their diet. It is near the top of the avian food chain in its range, in part since it is the only Andean eagle found outside forest habitats. It may compete for carrion with the much larger Andean condor.

It nests in high trees or on rocky cliffs, or if these are not available on high trees or even cacti. If no appropriate high place is available this species will nest in bushes or even on the ground. In Ecuador, nesting can be observed all year round; elsewhere it might have a more restricted breeding season but information is scant and somewhat contradictory. The male and female engage in courtship flights, and copulate over a prolonged time of several weeks as the pairs bond. Little is known of the actual nesting; the clutch contains usually 2 but sometimes 1 or 3 eggs, which are incubated for about a month. The nestlings presumably are covered in white down like in its relatives. While not aggressive under normal circumstances, the black-chested eagle-buzzard will fiercely attack humans if it considers itself or its offspring threatened.

Owing the wide overall range Geranoaetus melanoleucus is considered a Species of Least Concern by the IUCN. While it is rare and declining in places – e.g. in Rio Grande do Sul and Santa Catarina states in Brazil, or in parts of Argentina – its habitat requirements mean that it will to some degree benefit from deforestation and it has for example colonized regions of the former Mata Atlântica forest in Alagoas. The declines in Argentina have been attributed to poisoning by strychnine baits deployed by sheep farmers trying to eradicate pests.

Gallery

References

Buteoninae
Hawks
Eagles
Birds of South America
Birds described in 1819
Taxa named by Louis Jean Pierre Vieillot